The 1992 season was the Minnesota Vikings' 32nd in the National Football League (NFL). They finished with an 11–5 record to claim the NFC Central division title and returned to the playoffs after a two-year absence. They met the Washington Redskins in the wildcard round, the teams' first playoff meeting since victory for the Redskins in the 1987 NFC Championship game; the Redskins won again this time, 24–7.

Minnesota's starting quarterbacks were Rich Gannon, who went 8–4 in 12 starts, and Sean Salisbury, who won three of his four starts. The team's leading rusher was Terry Allen, who ran for 1,201 yards. Receivers Cris Carter and Anthony Carter led the team with 681 and 580 receiving yards, respectively.

Offseason
On January 10, 1992, Dennis Green was named the fifth head coach in franchise history.

1992 Draft

 These picks were involved in the Herschel Walker trade on October 12, 1989.
 Seattle traded their 2nd round selection (39th overall – Robert Harris) and a 1993 3rd round selection (57th overall) to Minnesota in exchange for DT Keith Millard on April 25, 1992.
 Tampa Bay traded their 9th round selection (227th overall) to Minnesota in exchange for LB Jimmy Williams.

Preseason

Regular season

Schedule

Note: Intra-division opponents are in bold text.

Standings

Postseason

Game summaries

NFC Wild Card Round: vs (#6) Washington Redskins

Statistics

Team leaders

League rankings

Staff

Roster

Awards and records
Audrey MacMillan, NFL leader, interceptions (8)

References

External links
1992 Minnesota Vikings at Pro-Football-Reference.com

Minnesota Vikings seasons
Minnesota
NFC Central championship seasons
Minnesota